Misdemeanor is the twelfth studio album by the British hard rock band UFO. After the disastrous tour supporting Making Contact, UFO disbanded, with Phil Mogg spending time in Los Angeles, where he contacted (through Mike Varney) guitarist Atomik Tommy M. Mogg decided to start a new band, involving the new American guitarist and Paul Gray, who had played bass guitar in the last UFO tour. The three of them recruited former UFO keyboard player Paul Raymond and drummer Robbie France and started writing new material. Chrysalis Records signed the new band as UFO and assigned experienced producer Nick Tauber for the recording process of a new album. France resigned before the recording started and was replaced by former Magnum drummer Jim Simpson. Paul Raymond quit the band during their US tour in August 1986 and was replaced for the rest of the tour by David Jacobson.

Track listing

Personnel
UFO
Phil Mogg – vocals
Paul Gray – bass guitar
Paul Raymond – keyboards, guitar
Tommy McClendon (Atomik Tommy M) – guitar
Jim Simpson – drums

Production
Nick Tauber – producer
Jon Jacobs – engineer, mixing
Steve Lyon – assistant engineer
Dave Wittman – remixing on tracks 1-3, 6, 7

Charts
Album 

Singles

References

1985 albums
UFO (band) albums
Chrysalis Records albums